Sartbash (Hartbaş) is a rural locality (a village) in Abdrashitovsky Selsoviet, Alsheyevsky District, Bashkortostan, Russia. The population was 2 as of 2010. There is 1 street.

Geography 
Sartbash is located 29 km east of Rayevsky (the district's administrative centre) by road. Krasnaya Zvezda is the nearest rural locality.

References 

Rural localities in Alsheyevsky District